Mambacayao Gamay is an island located in the Visayas, Philippines. The island is part of the Bantayan Island Group. Mambacayao Gamay is also part of Barangay Lipayran, along with Lipayran Island and Mambacayao Daku Island and under the jurisdiction of the municipality of Bantayan, Cebu. Most of the inhabitants of the islands are fisherfolks.

See also

 List of islands by population density

References

Islands of Cebu